Ángela María Fernández González (September 5, 1990 in Palma, Majorca, Spain) better known as Angy Fernández is a Spanish singer, actress, model, radio host and television presenter. She is well known for playing Paula Blasco in the Spanish television series Física o Química.

Biography 
She studied at the Josep María Llompart High School in Palma, where she also took courses of piano and dance. She has an older sister called Irene Fernández.

Career 
In 2005, she was a member of the contest Cami De L'Exit  in Majorca and worked for the local channel IB3 program Nit d'Exit.

In 2007, she took part in the singing competition series Factor X, where she was one of the finalists and released her first album Sola en el silencio.

Discography 
Angy (2008)
Física o Química (2010)
Drama Queen (2013)

Your Face Sounds Familiar 
Angy was the winner of the first Tu cara me suena, the original version of Your Face Sounds Familiar worldwide. 12 winning 3 finery imitating Lady Gaga, Cyndi Lauper and Christina Aguilera.

Filmography

Television (Non fiction)

Television (fiction)

Films

References

External links 
 angyweb.es
 
 Angy's verified account on Twitter
 Angy's Instagram

1990 births
Living people
People from Palma de Mallorca
Musicians from the Balearic Islands
Spanish television actresses
Spanish film actresses
21st-century Spanish singers
21st-century Spanish women singers
21st-century Spanish actresses